In Greek mythology, the name Xanthus or Xanthos (Ancient Greek: Ξάνθος means "yellow" or "fair hair") may refer to:

Divine
 Xanthus, the gods' name for Scamander, the great river of Troy and its patron god.
 Xanthus, one of the twelve sons of the god Pan who were allies of Dionysus during the latter's Indian campaign. His brothers were Aegicorus, Argennus, Argus, Celaeneus, Daphoeneus, Eugeneios, Glaucus, Omester, Philamnus, Phobus and Phorbas. Xanthos was said to have "a mane of hair like a bayard which gave that name to the horned frequenter of the rocks".
Human
 Xanthus, son of King Triopas and Oreasis.
 Xanthus, an Egyptian prince as son of King Aegyptus. He was killed by his wife-cousin, the Danaid Arcadia.
Xanthus, a member of the Arcadian royal family as the son of Erymanthus, descendant of King Lycaon. He was the father of Psophis, one of the possible eponyms of the city of Psophis.
Xanthus, a Theban prince as one of the Niobids, children of King Amphion and Niobe, daughter of King Tantalus of Lydia. He was the brother of Alalcomeneus, Eudorus, Argeius, Lysippus, Phereus, Pelopia, Chione, Clytia, Hore, Lamippe and Melia.
Xanthus, the lover of Alcinoe who left her family to be with him.
 Xanthus, husband of Herippe.
Xanthus, one of the four sons of Tremiles (eponym of Tremile=Lycia) and the nymph Praxidike, daughter of Ogygus. His three brothers were Tloos, Pinarus and Cragus. This Xanthus was probably the husband of Laodamia, the daughter of Bellerophon. By her, he became the father of Sarpedon who fought in the Trojan War.
Xanthus, father of Glaucippe, possible mother of Hecuba. He may be the same as the above river-god Xanthus (Scamander).
Xanthus, a Trojan warrior and son of Phaenops. Together with his twin brother Thoon, they were killed by Diomedes during the Trojan War.
Xanthos (King of Thebes), the son of Ptolemy, killed by Andropompus or Melanthus.
Equine
 Xanthus, one of the Mares of Diomedes.
Xanthus, one of Achilles' two horses; see Balius and Xanthus.
 Xanthus, one of Hector's horses.

Notes

References 

 Apollodorus, The Library with an English Translation by Sir James George Frazer, F.B.A., F.R.S. in 2 Volumes, Cambridge, MA, Harvard University Press; London, William Heinemann Ltd. 1921. ISBN 0-674-99135-4. Online version at the Perseus Digital Library. Greek text available from the same website.
Dictys Cretensis, from The Trojan War. The Chronicles of Dictys of Crete and Dares the Phrygian translated by Richard McIlwaine Frazer, Jr. (1931-). Indiana University Press. 1966. Online version at the Topos Text Project.
Diodorus Siculus, The Library of History translated by Charles Henry Oldfather. Twelve volumes. Loeb Classical Library. Cambridge, Massachusetts: Harvard University Press; London: William Heinemann, Ltd. 1989. Vol. 3. Books 4.59–8. Online version at Bill Thayer's Web Site
Diodorus Siculus, Bibliotheca Historica. Vol 1-2. Immanel Bekker. Ludwig Dindorf. Friedrich Vogel. in aedibus B. G. Teubneri. Leipzig. 1888-1890. Greek text available at the Perseus Digital Library.
 Euripides, The Rhesus of Euripides translated into English rhyming verse with explanatory notes by Gilbert Murray, LL.D., D.Litt., F.B.A., Regius Professor of Greek in the University of Oxford. Euripides. Gilbert Murray. New York. Oxford University Press. 1913. Online version at the Perseus Digital Library.
 Euripides, Euripidis Fabulae. vol. 3. Gilbert Murray. Oxford. Clarendon Press, Oxford. 1913. Greek text available at the Perseus Digital Library.
 Gaius Julius Hyginus, Fabulae from The Myths of Hyginus translated and edited by Mary Grant. University of Kansas Publications in Humanistic Studies. Online version at the Topos Text Project.
 Homer, The Iliad with an English Translation by A.T. Murray, Ph.D. in two volumes. Cambridge, MA., Harvard University Press; London, William Heinemann, Ltd. 1924. . Online version at the Perseus Digital Library.
Homer, Homeri Opera in five volumes. Oxford, Oxford University Press. 1920. . Greek text available at the Perseus Digital Library.
 Nonnus of Panopolis, Dionysiaca translated by William Henry Denham Rouse (1863-1950), from the Loeb Classical Library, Cambridge, MA, Harvard University Press, 1940.  Online version at the Topos Text Project.
 Nonnus of Panopolis, Dionysiaca. 3 Vols. W.H.D. Rouse. Cambridge, MA., Harvard University Press; London, William Heinemann, Ltd. 1940–1942. Greek text available at the Perseus Digital Library.
 Parthenius, Love Romances translated by Sir Stephen Gaselee (1882-1943), S. Loeb Classical Library Volume 69. Cambridge, MA. Harvard University Press. 1916.  Online version at the Topos Text Project.
 Parthenius, Erotici Scriptores Graeci, Vol. 1. Rudolf Hercher. in aedibus B. G. Teubneri. Leipzig. 1858. Greek text available at the Perseus Digital Library.
 Pausanias, Description of Greece with an English Translation by W.H.S. Jones, Litt.D., and H.A. Ormerod, M.A., in 4 Volumes. Cambridge, MA, Harvard University Press; London, William Heinemann Ltd. 1918. . Online version at the Perseus Digital Library
Pausanias, Graeciae Descriptio. 3 vols. Leipzig, Teubner. 1903.  Greek text available at the Perseus Digital Library.
 Quintus Smyrnaeus, The Fall of Troy translated by Way. A. S. Loeb Classical Library Volume 19. London: William Heinemann, 1913. Online version at theio.com
 Quintus Smyrnaeus, The Fall of Troy. Arthur S. Way. London: William Heinemann; New York: G.P. Putnam's Sons. 1913. Greek text available at the Perseus Digital Library.
 Stephanus of Byzantium, Stephani Byzantii Ethnicorum quae supersunt, edited by August Meineike (1790-1870), published 1849. A few entries from this important ancient handbook of place names have been translated by Brady Kiesling. Online version at the Topos Text Project.
 Strabo, The Geography of Strabo. Edition by H.L. Jones. Cambridge, Mass.: Harvard University Press; London: William Heinemann, Ltd. 1924. Online version at the Perseus Digital Library.
 Strabo, Geographica edited by A. Meineke. Leipzig: Teubner. 1877. Greek text available at the Perseus Digital Library.

Satyrs
Princes in Greek mythology
Sons of Aegyptus
Lycians
Trojans
People of the Trojan War
Argive characters in Greek mythology
Deeds of Apollo
Deeds of Artemis
Arcadian mythology
Lycia
Mythology of Argos